The Municipality of Sveti Tomaž is a municipality in northeastern Slovenia. It lies in the Prlekija Hills and was part of the Municipality of Ormož until 2006. The area belongs to the traditional region of Styria. It is now included in the Drava Statistical Region. The seat of the municipality is Sveti Tomaž.

Settlements
In addition to the municipal seat of Sveti Tomaž, the municipality also includes the following settlements:

 Bratonečice
 Gornji Ključarovci
 Gradišče pri Ormožu
 Hranjigovci
 Koračice
 Mala Vas pri Ormožu
 Mezgovci
 Pršetinci
 Rakovci
 Rucmanci
 Savci
 Sejanci
 Senčak
 Senik
 Trnovci
 Zagorje

References

External links

 Municipality of Sveti Tomaž website
 Municipality of Sveti Tomaž on Geopedia

Sveti Tomaž